Ancylolomia claudia is a moth in the family Crambidae. It was described by Graziano Bassi in 2013. It is found in Kenya and Tanzania.

References

Ancylolomia
Moths described in 2013
Moths of Africa